Waylla Q'awa Aymara waylla Stipa obtusa, a kind of feather grass, q'awa little river, ditch, crevice, fissure, gap in the earth, "stipa brook" or "stipa ravine", also spelled Huaylla Khaua) is a  mountain in the Andes of Bolivia. It is located in the Oruro Department, Challapata Province, Challapata Municipality. The Waylla Q'awa which originates east of the mountain flows along its eastern slope.

References 

Mountains of Oruro Department